The following table shows the European record progression in the men's 5000 metres running event, as ratified by the EAA.

Hand timing 

(a) Timed at 14:35.3  but rounded for record ratification 
(b) Timed at 14:16.9  but rounded for record ratification 
(c) Timed at 13:58.1  but rounded for record ratification 
(d) Timed at 13:17.21 but rounded for record ratification 
(e) Timed at 13:16.3  but rounded for record ratification

Automatic timing

References 

5000 m
European record
European 1500 metres record